Apex Mountain Resort is a ski resort in southwestern Canada, located in the Okanagan region on Beaconsfield Mountain, just west of Penticton, British Columbia.

There are 79 named trails accessed by four chairlifts, including one high-speed quad. The resort also offers four terrain parks and a tube park. Apex currently operates twelve snow guns that provide top-to-bottom snowmaking capability.

The mountain's main accommodation providers include Stay at Apex, Apex Lodge, and Apex Mountain Inn. Other activities that the resort provides include a  skating loop and a hockey rink. Nearby, Nickel Plate Nordic Centre also offers snowshoeing and cross-country skiing.

Runs (by lift and difficulty):

Stocks Triple Chair:

Beginner: Whipsaw, Finger, Dude-Ney Trail, Village Traverse, Easy Out, Greenhorn's Traverse, Stock's Traverse

Intermediate: Maverick, Stagecoach, Lucky Strike, Sluice Box, Gambit, Lower Gambit, Motherlode, Little Joe, Sweet Louise

Advanced: Window

Quickdraw Express Quad:

Beginner: Grandfather's Trail

Intermediate: Ben's Run, Wild Bill, Ridge Run, Juniper, 97C, Dawdler 1, Dawdler 2, Wildly Easy (Wildside), Easy Out (Wildside)

Advanced: Sun Bowl, West Bank, The Pit, The Great Wall, Toilet Bowl, Essendale, Grouse Gulch, Tongue, Hanks, Showboat, Highway 97, Face, Poma, Chute, K, K2, Magnum, Buckshot, Winchester, Golden Eagle, Shootout (Wildside), Gun Slinger (Wildside), Grandmother's Trail (Wildside), Hang’em High (Wildside), Lower Hang’em High (Wildside), Jackpot (Wildside), Showdown (Wildside), Bob's Run (Wildside), Glades (Wildside)

Expert: Tooth Tusk, Sweet Sue, Gromit, Gunbarrel, 22, Pea Shooter, Make My Day, Dirty Harry

T-Bar:

Beginner: Rookies Trail, Chicken Finger

Intermediate: Adrian's Alley, Spruce Hollow, Old Mill, Okanagan Run, Wishbone, Okanagan Night Park

Advanced: Andi's Alley, Kristi's

Terrain Parks: Skier/Boarder Cross, Claim Jumper, Prospector, Terrain Park

Magic Carpet (conveyor lift):

Beginner: Easy Rider

Tube Runs: Tube Park

See also
List of ski areas and resorts in Canada

References

External links 

www.stayatapex.com - Apex Accommodations - Apex Mountain Resort's primary accommodation provider
www.apexmountaininn.com - Apex Mountain only Full Service Hotel 
 Apex Mountain Resort - Official site
Apex Ski Area Information on SnowGuide.org

Ski areas and resorts in the Okanagan
Regional District of Okanagan-Similkameen